Vindegghallet Glacier is a glacier flowing west for 4 nautical miles (7 km) along the south side of Mount Flanuten in the Humboldt Mountains of Queen Maud Land. Discovered and photographed by the German Antarctic Expedition, 1938–39. Mapped by Norway from air photos and surveys by Norwegian Antarctic Expedition, 1956–60, and named Vindegghallet (the wind ridge slope) in association with nearby Vindegga Spur.

See also
 List of glaciers in the Antarctic
 Glaciology

References
 

Glaciers of Queen Maud Land
Humboldt Mountains (Antarctica)